West Allis Central High School is a public high school in West Allis, Wisconsin, United States. The school boundaries are the city of West Allis, village of West Milwaukee and portions of New Berlin and Greenfield. Central's cross-town rival is Nathan Hale High School.

History
Built and opened in 1920 as West Allis High School, the school's name was changed to West Allis Central in 1941. The original building was closed in 1973, when the school moved to its present location on West Lincoln Ave.

Programs
Central offers a wide variety or programs to garner academic success such as AVID, Project Lead the Way, and PBIS.

Athletics

Girls' athletics are softball, basketball, bowling, cross country, soccer, pom pons, swimming and diving, tennis, track and field, strength and conditioning, wrestling and volleyball.

Boys' athletics are basketball, bowling, cross country, soccer, swimming and diving, tennis, track and field, strength and conditioning, volleyball, baseball, football, golf, and wrestling. West Allis Central (then West Allis) won the state championship in boys' cross country in 1934. West Allis Central won the state championship in 1958.

Fight song

Student organizations
Student organizations include Book Club, Bulldog Buddies, Chess Club, Conservation Club, Debate, Foreign Language Club, Forensics, French Honor Society, Gay-Straight Alliance, German Honor Society, Helping Hands, HOSA, Math Team, Metric Club, Musical/Play, National Honor Society, Orchestra, SADD, Skills USA, Spanish Honor Society, Black Student Union, Student Council, and WAC Yearbook.

Notable alumni
Gary J. Barczak, politician
Allen Busby, educator and politician (graduate who later taught at WACHS)
Jerry Golsteyn, former NFL quarterback from 1977 to 1984
Robert T. Huber, 65th and 67th Speaker of the Wisconsin State Assembly
Jeff Jagodzinski, former football head coach at Boston College; former head coach of the Omaha Nighthawks
Dan Jansen, Olympic speed skater
Mehryn Kraker, 2017 draft pick for Washington Mystics, current women's basketball assistant coach at UW-Green Bay
Rocky Krsnich, Major League Baseball player 1949-1953
James Melka, former NFL linebacker in 1987
Chellsie Memmel, Olympic and former World Champion gymnast
Bill Miklich, former NFL player from 1947 to 1948
Chris Witty, Olympic speed skater

References

Szudy, L. A Half Century of Public Education in West Allis, Wisconsin, From 1906 to 1959. Ann Arbor: University Microfilms International.
Szudy, L. and Thompto, R. 100 Years of the West Allis and West Milwaukee Schools. Robert Thompto and the West Allis West Milwaukee School District.

External links
 

Public high schools in Wisconsin
Schools in Milwaukee County, Wisconsin
Greater Metro Conference
Educational institutions established in 1920
1920 establishments in Wisconsin